Moshpit Tragedy Records was a Canadian independent record label founded in Windsor, Ontario in 2006.  The label specializes releases punk, metal and some of their subgenres (crust, sludge, etc.).  In 2007, they became the first record label to abandon physical releases in favor of a fully "sliding-scale" or "pay what you want" download model.  The label has not been active since early 2013.

Origin 
Moshpit Tragedy began in the mid nineties booking local punk concerts in Windsor, Ontario, Canada.  The name came about after one of these shows when founder Rayny Forster was brought to the emergency room and a doctor dubbed him a "moshpit tragedy."  It wasn't until early 2006 that the first releases on the label were issued.

Pay-what-you-want downloading 
In 2007, the label abandoned releasing CDs in favor of a new sliding scale download format in which fans could pay as much or as little as they want to - even free - for a high quality MP3 album with print-ready sleeve artwork.

Roster 

Ablach
After The Bombs
Agrimonia
Alarido
Arrestum
Arsenal of Empties
Atakke
Autarch
Burnt Church
Burnt Cross
Contagium
Corrupt Leaders
Deathraid
Deportation
Descended From Rats
Devil's Son-In-Law
Disassociate
Diskelma
Dogma
Doom
Doomed Youth
The Dregs
Eskatol
Extinction of Mankind
Extreme Noise Terror
Filthpact
Hulluus
In Ruins
Krigblåst
Leper
Link
Livstid
Misery
Mutiny
Phobia
Power Is Poison
Securicor
Skaven
State of the Union
Suicide Watch
Survivors Will Be Shot Again
Tacheless
Total Crust Violence
Total Fucking Destruction
Vestiges
Virus
War//Plague

Partner labels 
Moshpit Tragedy has partnered with various other labels to make their releases available in pay-what-you-want format, including Relapse Records, Feral Ward Records, Inimical Records, Give Praise Records, Anti-Corp Records, and Replenish Records.  However, as of spring 2013 the label decided that with the widespread use of Bandcamp, it was no longer necessary to host titles for other labels.

References

External links 
Moshpit Tragedy Records website

Alternative rock record labels
Punk record labels
Hardcore record labels
Record labels established in 2006
Canadian independent record labels